Parkin may refer to:

 Parkin (cake), a type of cake
 Parkin (protein), a ligase
 Parkin (surname), people with the surname Parkin
 Parkin, a brand name of the drug trihexyphenidyl
 Parkin, a brand name of the drug profenamine

Places

 Parkin, Arkansas, a city in the United States
 Parkin Archeological State Park in Parkin, Arkansas, also known as Parkin Site

See also
 Parkan, a brand name of the drug budipine